Dongchimi is a variety of kimchi consisting of Korean radish, napa cabbage, scallions, pickled green chilli, ginger, Korean pear and watery brine in Korean cuisine. As the name dong (hangul: 동; hanja: 冬; literally "winter") and chimi (hangul: 치미, an ancient term for kimchi), suggests, this kimchi is traditionally consumed during the winter season.

Dongchimi is fermented like other varieties of kimchi, but its maturing period is relatively short (2–3 days). Although it can be made at any time of the year, it is usually made during the gimjang season. The northern regions consisting of Hamgyeong-do and Pyeongan-do in North Korea are particularly famous for their dongchimi.

The clear and clean taste of the watery dongchimi is used as a soup for making dongchimi guksu (동치미국수 cold noodle soup made with dongchimi) and naengmyeon, or served with tteok or steamed sweet potatoes to balance out the rich flavors.

Ingredients
Radish is the most important ingredient in dongchimi. Whole green or red peppers can be added as decoration but are not required. Leaf mustard, garlic, ginger and leeks, as well as other salted ingredients may be included.

Types

Baechu dongchimi (Cabbage dongchimi, 배추동치미)
Radish and napa cabbage stuffed with ingredients such as julienned radish, Korean chives, red peppers, garlic, and ginger is pickled in brine. Kelp stock is added for deep flavor before fermentation.

Daenamu dongchimi (Bamboo dongchimi, 대나무동치미)
Bamboo leaves are used as a main ingredient, giving the dongchimi a crisp and clean taste while adding texture. The fermentation process takes longer than other varieties of dongchimi due to its lower sodium content but it can also be stored much longer. It is a local specialty of South Jeolla province.

 Gungjung dongchimi (Royal dongchimi, 궁중 동치미)
Made from small radish, yuja, pomegranate, and Korean pears are added for a fragrant version.

There are many other variations depending on region and personal taste.

See also

References

External links

 Cooking video : Dongchimi at the Embassy of the Republic of Korea
 General information and recipe about dongchimi from The Korea Foundation
 Brief information and recipe about dongchimi
 Brief information and recipe about dongchimi
 Brief information about dongchimi and other kimchi
  Recipe of dongchimi from Munhwa Ilbo (Newspaper) Kimchi EXPO 2007
  General information a recipe about dongchimi

Kimchi
Cold soups
Spicy foods
Korean soups and stews
Cabbage soups
Ginger dishes